Gone Too Far may refer to:

In music:
 "Gone Too Far," a 1977 song by England Dan & John Ford Coley from the Dowdy Ferry Road LP
 "Gone Too Far" (Dragonette song)
 "Gone Too Far" (Eddie Rabbitt song)
 "Gone Too Far", a 1966 Tages song from their album Extra Extra
 "Gone Too Far", a 2007 Gotthard song from their album Domino Effect
In other media:
 Gone Too Far (TV series)
 Gone Too Far (story), a Transformers story
 Gone Too Far!, a 2007 play by Bola Agbaje